Iris Plotzitzka (born 7 January 1966 in Memmingen, Bavaria) is a retired West German shot putter.

She represented the sports clubs LAC Quelle Fürth and LC Olympiapark München, and won the silver medal at the West German championships in 1986. Her personal best throw was 20.53 metres, achieved in August 1988 in Köln.

Achievements

References

1966 births
Living people
People from Memmingen
Sportspeople from Swabia (Bavaria)
West German female shot putters
Athletes (track and field) at the 1988 Summer Olympics
Olympic athletes of West Germany